Mulcahy Barn is a historic building located south of Colo, Iowa, United States. It is a hybrid of German and English immigrant barns, and it is considered an excellent example of a bank barn. The German influence was the placement of the livestock on the lower level, while the simple lines of the upper level reflect the British/colonial influence. The Mulcahy's, who built the barn, were more than likely familiar with the latter. They learned the former after their arrival in Iowa, which had a large German and Scandinavian population by the time they arrived. It was completed around 1885 with board and batten siding on the upper portion and a fieldstone foundation. That foundation was replaced in the mid-20th century with concrete, and again with concrete in 2000. The barn was listed on the National Register of Historic Places in 2004.

It has a hay hood.

References

Infrastructure completed in 1885
Buildings and structures in Story County, Iowa
National Register of Historic Places in Story County, Iowa
Barns on the National Register of Historic Places in Iowa
Barns with hay hoods